Pleš  may refer to the following places:

Croatia
Pleš, Croatia, a village near Bednja

Serbia
Pleš (Aleksandrovac), a village

Slovakia
Pleš, Slovakia, a village in Lučenec District

Slovenia
Pleš, Dolenjske Toplice, a village in the Municipality of  Dolenjske Toplice
Pleš, Kočevje, a hamlet of Borovec pri Kočevski Reki
Pleš, Žužemberk, a village in the Municipality of Žužemberk

See also

Ples (disambiguation)